Mother and Father may refer to:

The Mother and The Father, English edition 2015 of La Mère 2010 and Le Père 2012 by French writer Florian Zeller
"Mother and father", song by Jerome Kern; M E Rourke; Charles Frew 1910
"Mother and Father", song by Madonna from American Life
"Mother & Father", song by New Zealand band Broods
"Mother/Father" by American no wave band Swans from The Great Annihilator

See also
Mama Tata religion
Father and Mother
Mom and Dad (disambiguation)